Joona Järvistö (born 29 December 1996) is a Finnish professional footballer who plays for FC Inter Turku, as a striker.

Career

Inter Turku
Järvistö joined Inter Turku from his childhood club, KaaPo on a one-year contract on 18 January 2018. Järvistö had had a good 2017 season with KaaPo, scoring 17 goals in 20 games, and had already went on a few trials at Inter Turku before signing for the club.

On 1 August 2019 the club announced, that Järvistö would be loaned out to his former club, KaaPo, for the rest of the year.

References

External links
Joona Järvistö at FC Inter Turku's website

1996 births
Living people
Finnish footballers
Kaarinan Pojat players
FC Inter Turku players
Kakkonen players
Veikkausliiga players
Association football forwards